The 1913 Oklahoma A&M Aggies football team represented Oklahoma A&M College in the 1913 college football season. This was the 13th year of football at A&M and the fifth under Paul J. Davis. The Aggies played their home games in Stillwater, Oklahoma. They finished the season 4–3.

Schedule

References

Oklahoma AandM
Oklahoma State Cowboys football seasons
Oklahoma AandM Aggies football